Anthony Elshaug (born 19 July 1960) is a former Australian rules footballer who played for the Melbourne Football Club, Essendon Football Club and Collingwood Football Club in the Victorian Football League (VFL). 

Since retiring, he has worked as an assistant coach and recruitment officer at various AFL clubs.

Playing career
A rover, Elshaug made his league debut in 1979 with Melbourne and by the age of 19 was representing Victoria in interstate football. He crossed to Essendon in 1984 and was a member of its 1985 premiership side, kicking 37 goals for the season. After a short stint with Collingwood in 1988 he finished his career in the Victorian Football Association with Dandenong, whom he captain-coached to the 1991 premiership.

Coaching career
After retiring from playing AFL football,  Elshaug was a premiership playing coach at Dandenong (VFA) in 1991, then moved straight into a role as regional manager for the Eastern Ranges, in the newly established TAC Cup, which had only just replaced the former VFL/AFL Under 19s competition. After two years at Eastern, Elshaug became an assistant coach to Denis Pagan at the North Melbourne Football Club.  He was an assistant under Pagan for thirteen years, at North Melbourne from 1994 until 2002, and then at Carlton Football Club from 2003 until 2006. In 2007, he moved to the St Kilda Football Club. Throughout his coaching career, he has been involved in developmental, senior assistant, and reserves gameday coaching roles. He resigned from his coaching in the middle of the 2010 season for personal reasons, then returned to St Kilda as the recruiting manager in 2011.  He stepped down as the List Manager on 15 June 2018.

References

External links

Demon Wiki profile

1960 births
Living people
Collingwood Football Club players
Melbourne Football Club players
Essendon Football Club players
Essendon Football Club Premiership players
Dandenong Football Club players
Dandenong Football Club coaches
Australian rules footballers from Victoria (Australia)
One-time VFL/AFL Premiership players